Vepr is Russian or Ukrainian  for a Wild boar (Ru:вепрь and UK:Вепр) can also refer to:

Vehicles
VEPR, a Ukrainian off-road vehicle
GAZ Vepr, a version of the GAZ Sadko

Weapons
Vepr, a Ukrainian assault rifle
Molot Vepr, a Russian series of semi-automatic hunting and sporting rifles based on the RPK
Vepr-12, a series of Russian semi-automatic shotguns based on the Molot Vepr

Vessels
Russian submarine K-157 Vepr

See also
 Javelina